WMAM (570 AM) is a class D AM radio station in Marinette, Wisconsin, serving the Marinette/Menominee, Michigan area.  They operate omnidirectionally with a daytime power of 250 watts and a reduced nighttime power of 100 watts.

Although presently classified as a Class D station, this station was originally classified as a "Class C [Class IV; Local] station 'grandfathered' as operating on a Class B [Class III; Regional] channel" one of only two such stations in the U.S. Official FCC license note: "CLASS IV ON REGIONAL CHANNEL; SEE §73.29"

WMAM currently carries ESPN Radio.

History

The call letters WMAM were previously assigned to a radio station in Beaumont, Texas, from August 1922 until October 1923.

WMAM in Marinette started in 1939, where the call letters reportedly stand for "Marinette and Menominee," or, "Wisconsin Michigan Air Messenger."

WMAM filed for a television license in July 1952, as WMBV-TV channel 11. By 1959, WMBV-TV moved to Green Bay and became WLUK-TV.

Ownership
1939: M & M Broadcasting, Inc. 
1956: Guild Films Co. purchases both WMAM and WMBV-TV
(Year Unknown): Quicksilver Broadcasting, LLC
2006: Armada Media – Menominee, Inc. a.k.a. Armada Media Corporation
2014: Radio Plus Bay Cities, LLC

Personnel
A notable personality at WMAM was Howard Emich, who worked at WMAM from 1940 to 1980.  Known as "Marinette’s Newsman", he delivered over 10,000 news broadcasts and was inducted into the Wisconsin Broadcasters Association Hall of Fame in 1998.

References

External links
Armada Media website

MAM
Sports radio stations in the United States
ESPN Radio stations
Radio stations established in 1939
CBS Sports Radio stations
1939 establishments in Wisconsin